"Gee, But It's Lonely" is a song by Pat Boone that reached number 31 on the Bllboard Hot 100 in 1958.

Track listing

Charts

References 

1958 songs
1958 singles
Pat Boone songs
Dot Records singles